The 1973 Toledo Rockets football team was an American football team that represented the University of Toledo in the Mid-American Conference (MAC) during the 1973 NCAA Division I football season. In their third season under head coach Jack Murphy, the Rockets compiled a 3–8 record (1–4 against MAC opponents), finished in a tie for last place in the MAC, and were outscored by all opponents by a combined total of 288 to 229.

The team's statistical leaders included Gene Swick with 2,234 passing yards, Herman Price with 595 rushing yards, and Don Seymour with 773 receiving yards.

Schedule

References

Toledo
Toledo Rockets football seasons
Toledo Rockets football